Pseudotropheus crabro, the Bumblebee Cichlid or Hornet Cichlid, is a species of cichlid  endemic to Lake Malawi where it is found in different habitats but most frequently in large caves or in the vicinity of large boulders. This species can reach a length of  SL.

The bumblebee cichlid has an elongate body with vertical yellow-and-black "bumblebee" bars. Juveniles are brightly colored but become darker when mature, especially for males. This fish is known for its ability to rapidly change its colors. They are mouthbrooders like many other cichlids from Lake Malawi.

In their natural habitats, the bumblebee cichlid is a cleaner specialized in feeding on parasites from larger fish particularly the catfish Bagrus meridionalis, which apparently recognises the species as a cleaner. Notable is that P. crabro has also been found preying upon the eggs of the Bagrus meridionalis, but will change colour to a dark brown while doing so.

Aquarium care 
In the wild, the bumblebee cichlid is a specialized eater, but in aquarium they can eat whatever that is fed to them. Like other mbuna cichilds, this is a hardy and very aggressive fish that should be kept in a species or mbuna tank. The best practice is to keep one male with several females. Breeding is relatively easy. Females hold eggs and fry in their mouths for up to three weeks, then release a small number of healthy fry.

See also
Mbuna
List of freshwater aquarium fish species

References

Malawi cichlids in their natural habitat, 3rd edition, Ad Konigs, Cichlid Press, 2001

crabro
Taxa named by Anthony James Gerrit Van Lier Ribbink
Taxa named by Digby S. C. Lewis 
Fish described in 1982